Giovanni "Giò" Di Tonno (born 5 August 1973) is an Italian pop singer. In duo with Lola Ponce he won the 2008 edition of the Sanremo Music Festival, with the song "Colpo di fulmine" written by Gianna Nannini.

Discography

Albums 
 1994: Giò Di Tonno
 2008: Santafè
 2014: Giò

References

External links 
 Giò Di Tonno's record label

Italian pop singers
Living people
Italian singer-songwriters
Italian male stage actors
Italian male musical theatre actors
Sanremo Music Festival winners
1973 births
People from Pescara